Miguel Ángel Vargas Mañán (born 15 June 1996) is a Chilean-Peruvian footballer who currently plays for Cienciano del Cusco as a goalkeeper.

International career
Along with Chile U20, he won the L'Alcúdia Tournament in 2015.

He got his first call up to the senior Chile squad for a friendly against Paraguay in September 2015.

Personal life
Vargas is of Peruvian descent and has been with the Chile national team at under levels. Also, his grandfather, Gustavo Vargas, was a goalkeeper who played for Peruvian club Alianza Lima. Since December 2021, Vargas holds the Peruvian nationality, so he is elegible to play for Peru.

He is nicknamed Manotas (Big Hands) since he was a child due to the fact that a football coach noticed he wore a big gloves in a training session for Colo-Colo.

Honours
Universidad Católica
 Primera División (3): 2016–A, 2016–C, 2018
 Supercopa de Chile (1): 2016

Chile U20
 L'Alcúdia International Tournament (1): 2015

References

External links
 
 

1996 births
Living people
Chilean people of Peruvian descent
Footballers from Santiago
Chile youth international footballers
Chile under-20 international footballers
Chilean footballers
Association football goalkeepers
Club Deportivo Universidad Católica footballers
Deportes Santa Cruz footballers
Cobresal footballers
Unión La Calera footballers
Cienciano footballers
Chilean Primera División players
Segunda División Profesional de Chile players
Peruvian Primera División players
Chilean emigrants to Peru
Citizens of Peru through descent
Peruvian footballers
Peruvian people of Chilean descent